Arie Vardi (born 1937) is a classical pianist, conductor, and piano pedagogue. He is laureate of the Israel Prize in 2017.

Biography
Vardi was born in Tel Aviv and graduated from the Rubin Academy (renamed the Buchmann-Mehta School of Music in 2005) and earned a law degree at Tel Aviv University. He obtained a soloist diploma from at City of Basel Music Academy. Among his music teachers were Paul Baumgartner (piano), Pierre Boulez and Karlheinz Stockhausen (composition). He then went on to become professor of piano and head of department at the Rubin Academy, and later became the head of the school.

Music career
Vardi launched his concert career at the age of fifteen as the winner of the Chopin Competition in Israel and the George Enescu International Competition in Bucharest. 

Vardi performs regularly as soloist-conductor, playing the complete set of concerti by Bach and Mozart, part of which he has played on the Hammerflügel. His extensive repertoire includes various Israeli works, many of which were dedicated to him. In the 2001 season, Vardi directed, conducted and played a series of five concerts with the Israel Chamber Orchestra. The series, entitled "The Piano Concerto", featured twelve concertos ranging from Bach to the 21st century. In the 2004–5 season he launched a new weekend series with the Israel Philharmonic, "Morning Intermezzo", where he serves as conductor and presenter. For television viewers he is best known for his series Master Classes, the family series of the Israel Philharmonic Orchestra which he conducts and presents, and also currently for his new series Intermezzo with Arik.

Students
Vardi’s students include concert artists Nareh Arghamanyan, Yefim Bronfman, Daniel Gortler, Chi-Ho Han, Martin Helmchen, Claire Huangci, Łukasz Krupiński, Yundi Li, Aleksandra Mikulska, Mateusz Molęda, Francesco Piemontesi, Tomoki Sakata, Lahav Shani, Dmitry Shishkin, Alessandro Taverna and Beatrice Rana.

Mathematician Noam Elkies was a student of his between 1972 and 1978.

Jury member
 Vardi is currently the artistic advisor and chairman of the jury of the Arthur Rubinstein International Master Competition.

Master classes
Vardi has held master classes and presented lecture recitals at many of the world's top conservatories. His recordings of Mozart concertos have included the Concerto for Three Pianos with Yefim Bronfman and Radu Lupu. Vardi teaches at the Hochschule für Musik Hannover, Germany, and at the Buchmann-Mehta School of Music in Tel Aviv.

Awards and recognition
His recordings have won critical acclaim. In 2004, the Minister of Education Award was bestowed upon him for his lifetime achievement. In 2017, Vardi was awarded the Israel Prize.

References

External links

1937 births
Living people
Israeli classical pianists
Piano pedagogues
Israeli music educators
Israeli conductors (music)
Tel Aviv University alumni
Jewish classical pianists
Jewish Israeli musicians
21st-century conductors (music)
21st-century classical pianists
21st-century Israeli male musicians
20th-century conductors (music)
20th-century classical pianists
20th-century Israeli male musicians
Male conductors (music)
Male classical pianists
Musicians from Tel Aviv